The City of Charles Sturt is a local government area in the western suburbs of Adelaide, South Australia, stretching to the coast.

The council was formed on 1 January 1997 as a result of the amalgamation of the City of Hindmarsh Woodville and the City of Henley and Grange. It comprises a mix of residential, industrial and commercial areas and had a population of 111,759 in 2016.

History

The first local government to be established in the area was the District Council of Hindmarsh (established in 1853), covering the north west suburbs of Adelaide south of the port and north of the Torrens. The boundaries of the Hindmarsh district council were remarkably similar to the boundaries of the City of Charles Sturt, but the intervening years from 1874 to 1997 saw several divisions and amalgamations in the original council area, leading to the current boundaries.

In 1874 the Town of Hindmarsh seceded from the original district council, the latter changing its name to District Council of Woodville a year later. The Town of Hindmarsh included the near-city communities of Hindmarsh, Bowden, Brompton, Croydon and what would become Renown Park. The District Council of Woodville ultimately came to be seated at the present-day civic centre on Woodville Road at Woodville.

As part of the District Councils Act 1887 consolidation of local government in the state, the rump of the District Council of Glanville was amalgamated into Woodville council as the Davenport ward in 1888. This closely following the creation of the Town of Semaphore which removed a significantly-populated portion of Glanville. This now meant that the Woodville council's western boundary was the coastline from the Torrens to Fort Glanville.

In December 1915, the seaside communities of Henley Beach and Grange seceded from Woodville council (along with the West Beach area of West Torrens council) to form the Municipality of Henley and Grange

The Woodville and Hindmarsh councils were reunited in 1993 as the City of Hindmarsh Woodville, and, four years later, the City of Henley and Grange was also reunited to form the present boundaries as the City of Charles Sturt.

Councillors

The current council  is:

Suburbs

 Albert Park
 Allenby Gardens
 Athol Park
 Beverley
 Bowden
 Brompton
 Cheltenham
 Croydon
 Devon Park
 Findon
 Flinders Park
 Fulham Gardens
 Grange
 Hendon
 Henley Beach
 Henley Beach South
 Hindmarsh
 Kidman Park
 Kilkenny
 Ovingham
 Pennington
 Renown Park
 Ridleyton
 Rosewater
 Royal Park
 Seaton
 Semaphore Park
 St Clair
 Tennyson
 Welland
 West Beach
 West Croydon
 West Hindmarsh
 West Lakes
 West Lakes Shore
 Woodville
 Woodville North
 Woodville Park
 Woodville South
 Woodville West

See also
 List of Adelaide parks and gardens

References

External links
City of Charles Sturt website
City of Charles Sturt LGA SA page
City of Charles Sturt community profile

Charles Sturt, City of
Charles Sturt, City of
Charles Sturt, City of
Charles Sturt